Napa Valley is an American Viticultural Area (AVA) located in Napa County in California's Wine Country. It was established by the  Bureau of Alcohol, Tobacco and Firearms (ATF) on January 27, 1981. Napa Valley is considered one of the premier wine regions in the world. Records of commercial wine production in the region date back to the nineteenth century, but premium wine production dates back only to the 1960s.

The combination of Mediterranean climate, geography and geology of the region are conducive to growing quality wine grapes. John Patchett established the Napa Valley's first commercial vineyard in 1858. In 1861 Charles Krug established another of Napa Valley's first commercial wineries in St. Helena. Viticulture in Napa suffered several setbacks in the late 19th and early 20th centuries, including an outbreak of the vine disease phylloxera, the institution of Prohibition, and the Great Depression. The wine industry in Napa Valley recovered, and helped by the results of the Paris Wine Tasting of 1976, came to be seen as capable of producing the best quality wine – equal to that of Old World wine regions. Napa Valley is now a major enotourism destination.

Geography 
The valley floor is flanked by the Mayacamas Mountain Range on the western and northern sides the Vaca Mountains on the eastern side. Several smaller valleys exist within these two ranges. The Oakville and Rutherford American Viticultural Areas (AVAs) lie within a geographical area known as the Rutherford Bench in the center of the valley floor. The soil in the southern end of the valley consists mainly of sediments deposited by earlier advances and retreats of San Pablo Bay while the soil at the northern end of the valley contains a large volume of volcanic lava and ash. Several of the small hills that emerge from the middle of the valley floor near Yountville are indicators of the region's volcanic past.

Climate 
Several mesoclimates exist within the area due to various weather and geographical influences. The open southern end of the valley floor is cooler during the growing season due to the proximity of San Pablo Bay while the sheltered, closed northern end is often much warmer. The eastern side of the valley tends to be more arid due to the rain shadow caused by the western mountains and hills.

History

Early years 
Early pioneer and settler George C. Yount is generally credited to have been the first to grow grapes in the Napa Valley.

Commercial production started in 1858, with John Patchett selling wine for $2 per gallon. His wine cellar, built in 1859, narrowly predates that established in 1861 in St. Helena by Charles Krug, although this is commonly cited as the Napa Valley's first winery.

Captain Gustave Niebaum established Inglenook Winery in 1879 near the village of Rutherford. This was the first Bordeaux style winery in the USA. Inglenook wines won gold medals at the 1889 World's Fair in Paris.

In 1868 H. W. Crabb bought land near Oakville close to the Napa River. Crabb established a vineyard and winery named To Kalon, and by 1877 had planted  and was producing 50,000 US gallons of wine per year. Crabb experimented with over 400 grape varieties to find the types best suited for the area.

By the end of the nineteenth century there were more than one hundred and forty wineries in the area. Of those original wineries, several still exist in the valley today including Beaulieu, Beringer, Charles Krug, Chateau Montelena, Far Niente, Mayacamas, Markham Vineyards, and Schramsberg Vineyards.

Phylloxera, Prohibition and the Great Depression 

Viticulture in Napa suffered several setbacks in the late 19th and early 20th centuries. The Phylloxera louse killed many of the vines throughout the valley. Prohibition, enacted in 1920, caused many wineries to shut down. A few remained open with agreements to produce sacramental wine. Growers who elected to keep their vines planted sold their crops to home winemakers. The Great Depression slowed the wine business further. These events stalled the growth of the wine industry in Napa County, California for years.

Modern era 
André Tchelistcheff is generally credited with ushering in the modern era of winemaking in California. Beaulieu hired Tchelisticheff in 1938. He introduced several techniques and procedures to the region, such as aging wine in small French Oak barrels, cold fermentation, vineyard frost prevention, and malolactic fermentation.

Following Prohibition, Beringer Vineyards invited attendees of the Golden Gate International Exposition to visit the winery using promotional maps printed with the phrase "All roads lead to Beringer" in 1939. The winery also invited Hollywood stars including Clark Gable, Charles Laughton and Carole Lombard to visit. These early promotions are considered to be the birth of wine-based tourism that is now a large part of the economy of Napa Valley today.

Brother Timothy of Christian Brothers winery was also instrumental in establishing the modern wine industry in Napa. After an earlier career as a teacher, he transferred to the order's Mont La Salle located on Mount Veeder in the Mayacamas Mountains northwest of Napa in 1935 to become the wine chemist for the order's expanding wine operations. Christian Brothers had grown grapes and made sacramental wine in Benicia, California during Prohibition, but decided to branch out into commercial production of wine and brandy after the repeal of Prohibition. The science teacher was a fast learner and soon established Christian Brothers as one of the leading brands in the state's budding wine industry. Brother Timothy's smiling face in advertisements and promotional materials became one of the most familiar images for wine consumers across the country. Following the Second World War, the wine industry in Napa began to thrive again.

In 1965, Napa Valley icon Robert Mondavi broke away from his family's Charles Krug estate to found his own winemaking operation in Oakville. It was the first new large scale winery to be established in the valley since prohibition and included the original To Kalon land. After this, the number of wineries in the valley grew rapidly, as did the region's reputation.

Napa Valley as a top wine region 

In 1976, the region got a boost from the Paris Wine Tasting of 1976, which featured a Napa Valley Chardonnay and Cabernet Sauvignon besting several famous French labels in a blind tasting format.  The story of the wine competition, termed the "Judgment of Paris", was made into a Hollywood movie in 2008, called Bottle Shock.   The results of this tasting cemented the region's reputation as a producer of world class wines.

A modern outbreak of phylloxera was discovered in the valley in 1983 in a vineyard planted with AxR1 rootstock. Many growers seized upon this outbreak as an opportunity to switch to varieties that were better suited to the climate and soil. By the late 1990s about 75% of the affected vineyards had been replanted with phylloxera resistant rootstock. The growers in the region have since channeled their energy to battle the Glassy-winged sharpshooter, a non-native pest that carries Pierce's disease.

A trend of larger national and international companies like E & J Gallo Winery, Diageo and Constellation Brands buying smaller wineries, vineyards and brands began to gain momentum in the early part of the 21st century. Today Napa Valley features more than 450 wineries that grow grape varieties including Cabernet Sauvignon, Chardonnay, Pinot noir, Merlot, Zinfandel, among others. While winemakers may produce wines from specific AVAs within the valley, many wines are made as a blend from grapes grown on the valley floor and the surrounding hillsides.

Enotourism 
More than 4.5 million people visit Napa Valley each year, making it a very popular tourist destination in California.

American Viticultural Areas (AVAs) of Napa Valley 

Within the Napa Valley AVA, there are sixteen sub-AVAs:

See also 
 California wine
 Coast Ranges (California)
 Geography of California
 Napa Valley Wine Train
 Sonoma County wine
 Napa County wine

References

External links 

 Napa Valley Region
 Napa Valley Vintners
  TTB AVA Map

.
 01
American Viticultural Areas of the San Francisco Bay Area
Geography of Napa County, California
American Viticultural Areas
Tourist attractions in Napa County, California
1981 establishments in California
United States products with protected designation of origin